Michael Bonner was a Jewish scholar of Islamic studies. Born in 1952, he died in May 2019. He received his PhD in Near Eastern Studies from Princeton in 1987. He was a professor of Medieval Islamic History at the University of Michigan, Ann Arbor, where he served as chair of the department of Near Eastern Studies from 2010-2019. In addition to his monographs, he published dozens of scholarly articles and translations.

Major works
Islam in the Middle Ages: The Origins and Shaping of Classical Islamic Civilization. With Jacob Lassner. Oxford: Praeger/ABC Clio, 2010.
Les Origines du jihâd. Paris: Les Éditions du Téraèdre, 2004.
Appeared in English as Jihad in Islamic History: Doctrines and Practices. Princeton: Princeton University Press, 2006.
Translated into Italian as La jihad, Rubbettino, 2008.
Islam, Democracy and the State in Algeria: Lessons for the Western Mediterranean and Beyond. Co-edited with Mark Tessler and Megan Reif. A special issue of Journal of North African Studies (2004), and a volume published by Routledge, 2005.
"Arab-Byzantine Relations". Vol. 8 of The Formation of the Classical Islamic World, under general editorship of Lawrence I. Conrad. Aldershot, UK: Ashgate/Variorum, 2004.
Poverty and Charity in Middle Eastern Contexts. Co-edited with Amy Singer and Mine Ener. SUNY Press, 2003.
Aristocratic Violence and Holy War: Studies on the Jihad and the Arab-Byzantine Frontier. New Haven: American Oriental Society Monograph Series, 1996.

References

American Islamic studies scholars
University of Michigan faculty
Scholars of medieval Islamic history
Jewish scholars of Islam
1952 births
2019 deaths